Ramsey Emmanuel Lewis Jr. (May 27, 1935 – September 12, 2022) was an American jazz pianist, composer, and radio personality. Lewis recorded over 80 albums and received five gold records and three Grammy Awards in his career. His album The In Crowd earned Lewis critical praise and the 1965 Grammy Award for Best Jazz Performance. His best known singles include "The In Crowd", "Wade in the Water", and "Sun Goddess". Until 2009, he was the host of the Ramsey Lewis Morning Show on the Chicago radio station WNUA.

Lewis was also active in musical education in Chicago. He founded the Ramsey Lewis Foundation, established the Ravinia's Jazz Mentor Program, and served on the board of trustees for the Merit School of Music and The Chicago High School for the Arts.

Life and career 

Ramsey Lewis was born on May 27, 1935, in Chicago to Ramsey Lewis Sr. and Pauline Lewis. He began taking piano lessons at the age of four. As a young man, Lewis played with a number of local ensembles, such as Edward Virgil Abner's Knights of Music. Lewis would eventually join a jazz group called the clefs. He later formed the Ramsey Lewis Trio with drummer Isaac "Redd" Holt and bassist Eldee Young. They eventually signed to Chess Records.

In 1956, the trio issued their debut album, Ramsey Lewis and his Gentle-men of Swing. Following their 1965 hit "The In Crowd" (the single reached No. 5 on the pop charts, and the album No. 2) they concentrated more on pop material. Young and Holt left in 1966 to form Young-Holt Unlimited and were replaced by Cleveland Eaton and Maurice White. White left to form Earth, Wind & Fire and was replaced by Morris Jennings in 1970. Later, Frankie Donaldson and Bill Dickens replaced Jennings and Eaton; Felton Crews also appeared on Lewis' 1981 album Three Piece Suite.

By 1966, Lewis was one of the nation's most successful jazz pianists, having had hits with "The In Crowd", "Hang On Sloopy", and "Wade in the Water." All three singles each sold over one million copies and were awarded gold discs. In the 1970s, Lewis often played electric piano, although by later in the decade he was sticking to acoustic piano and using an additional keyboardist in his groups.

In addition to recording and performing, Lewis hosted the weekly syndicated radio program Legends of Jazz, created in 1990, syndicated by United Stations Radio Networks. He also hosted the Ramsey Lewis Morning Show on Chicago "smooth jazz" radio station WNUA (95.5 FM). In December 2006, this morning show became part of Broadcast Architecture's Smooth Jazz Network, simulcasting on other smooth jazz stations across the country until its cancellation in May 2009, when WNUA switched over to a Spanish format.

Ramsey founded the Ramsey Lewis Foundation, which promoted musical instrument education to children, in 2005.

In 2006, a well-received 13-episode Legends of Jazz television series hosted by Lewis was broadcast on public TV nationwide and featured live performances by a variety of jazz artists including Larry Gray, Dr. Lonnie Smith, Joey Defrancesco, Dave Brubeck, Chick Corea, Kurt Elling, Benny Golson, Pat Metheny, and Tony Bennett.

Lewis was artistic director of Jazz at Ravinia (an annual feature at the Ravinia Festival in Highland Park, Illinois) and helped organize Ravinia's Jazz Mentor Program. Ramsey also served on the board of trustees for the Merit School of Music and The Chicago High School for the Arts.

Distinctions, honors, awards 
Lewis was an honorary member of Phi Beta Sigma fraternity. In May 2008, Lewis received an honorary doctorate from Loyola University Chicago upon delivering the keynote address at the undergraduate commencement ceremony.

In January 2007, the Dave Brubeck Institute invited Lewis to join its Honorary Board of Friends at the University of the Pacific in Stockton, California. Lewis was an Honorary Board member of the Chicago Jazz Orchestra.

Death 
Lewis died in his sleep at his home in Chicago, on September 12, 2022, at age 87.

Discography

Albums

Singles

As sideman 
With Max Roach

 MAX (Argo, 1958)

With Jimmy Woode

 The Colorful Strings of Jimmy Woode (Argo, 1957)

With Young/Holt

 Feature Spot (Cadet, 1967)

Awards and recognitions

Grammy history

Certifications

Recognition 
 1997: Ramsey Lewis was inducted as a Laureate of The Lincoln Academy of Illinois and awarded the Order of Lincoln (the state's highest honor) by the Governor of Illinois in the area of The Performing Arts.
 2002: Lewis participated in the 2002 Winter Olympics torch relay, lighting the cauldron for its brief stop in Chicago.
 2003: NAACP Image Award, Best Jazz Artist, for his album Simple Pleasures (2003)
 2006: 22nd Annual Stellar Gospel Music Awards, Best Gospel Instrumental Album, With One Voice (2005)
 2007: National Endowment for the Arts, Jazz Masters Award
 2007: Landmarks Illinois, Legendary Landmark Award, as one of living treasures of Illinois. "Just like our landmarked buildings, our three Legendary Landmarks have been critical to the civic well-being of Chicago and stand as a testimony to the greatness of our cultural integrity" said David Bahlman, president of Landmarks Illinois.

References

External links 
 
 
 
 
 PBS – Legends of Jazz (TV)
 Ramsey Lewis interview by Pete Lewis, 'Blues & Soul' March 2010
 Interview, About.com
 Ramsey's Rhythms
 Jazz Monthly Feature Interview: Ramsey Lewis
 Legends of Jazz podcasts 
 Legends of Jazz with Ramsey Lewis (radio) at WDCB
 Ramsey Lewis Interview NAMM Oral History Library (2017)

1935 births
2022 deaths
20th-century African-American musicians
20th-century American male musicians
20th-century American pianists
21st-century African-American musicians
21st-century American male musicians
21st-century American pianists
African-American jazz pianists
American male jazz musicians
American male pianists
Argo Records artists
Cadet Records artists
Chicago Musical College alumni
Grammy Award winners
GRP All-Star Big Band members
Jazz musicians from Chicago
Mercury Records artists
Northern soul musicians
Radio personalities from Chicago
Smooth jazz pianists
Soul-jazz pianists